Apocynum venetum, commonly known as sword-leaf dogbane, is a plant species in the dogbane family that is poisonous but used as a source of fiber, medicine, and nectar for production of honey.

Distribution and habitat
Apocynum venetum is considered to be native to a wide range in northern Asia and SE Europe: Italy, Bulgaria, Romania, Ex/Yugoslavia, Turkey, Ukraine, Russia, Siberia, Central Asia, Iran, Iraq, Cyprus, Pakistan, Afghanistan, China, and Japan. It grows in swamps, wet places, and maritime sands.

Uses
Apocynum venetum fibers can be extracted from the A. venetum bast; these fibers possess the luster of silk, smoothness of ramie, malleability of cashmere, and the softness of cotton. Apocynum venetum leaves have been used in the traditional medicine for hypertension treatment.

Subspecies

Subspecies include:
 Apocynum venetum subsp. armenum (Pobed.) ined. - Turkey, Iran, Caucasus
 Apocynum venetum subsp. basikurumon (H.Hara) ined. - Japan
 Apocynum venetum subsp. lancifolium (Russanov) ined. - Siberia, China (including Tibet + Xinjiang), Mongolia, Kazakhstan, Kyrgyzstan, Uzbekistan
 Apocynum venetum subsp. russanovii (Pobed.) ined. - Ostriv Dzharylhach Peninsula in Ukraine
 Apocynum venetum subsp. sarmatiense (Woodson) ined. - Bulgaria, Russia, Ukraine, Turkey, Iran, Iraq, Caucasus
 Apocynum venetum subsp. scabrum (Russanov) ined. - Kazakhstan, Turkmenistan, Tajikistan, Afghanistan, Iran, Pakistan 
 Apocynum venetum subsp. tauricum (Pobed.) ined. - Cape St. Ilya in Crimea
 Apocynum venetum subsp. venetum - Italy

References

External links
ITIS Standard Report for Apocynum cannabinum
Jepson Manual Treatment of Apocynum cannabinum — invasive plant species in California.

Apocyneae
Flora of Southeastern Europe
Flora of Central Asia
Flora of Western Asia
Flora of temperate Asia
Flora of China
Flora of Japan
Flora of Mongolia
Flora of Pakistan
Flora of Russia
Flora of the Caucasus
Plants described in 1753
Taxa named by Carl Linnaeus
Fiber plants
Butterfly food plants